Bathampton railway station is a former railway station in Bath, UK, serving the community of Bathampton. The station opened on 2 February 1857 and closed on 3 October 1966. Very little remains, as the station site was replaced with improved trackwork for a nearby junction. The only significant remains are the gateposts at the head of the approach road.

History
The Act of Parliament authorising the WS&WR had stipulated that it should also build a branch line connecting its main line to Bath, in order to communicate with Bristol, but owing to difficulty in obtaining finance, this was not proceeded with. Bathampton station was mainly used by the people who lived in eastern Bath.

The station had two platforms, used by both main line and branch trains; the junction of the two routes was at the eastern end of the station. The main and branch lines had been built to the broad gauge; during June 1874, the main line from the junction to the west was altered to mixed gauge, and the Bradford-on-Avon branch was converted to standard gauge; the main line from the junction to the east was altered to mixed gauge in March 1875; and the main line was altered from mixed gauge to standard gauge in May 1892. The main line was always double track, but the branch, which had been built as single-track, was doubled in May 1885. The station had several sidings, some of which served a timber works. There were two signal boxes, Bathampton and Bathampton West, which were replaced by a single signal box on 21 September 1956.

Proposed reopening
The reopening of Bathampton station was initially proposed as part of the MetroWest project for local rail services in the West of England. A study into its reopening was undertaken in 2015, which concluded a cost of between £3 million and £11 million.

Accidents and incidents
On 11 June 1875,a passenger train was derailed at Bathampton Junction. One person was killed and six were injured, three seriously.
On 2 July 1876, a freight train was derailed at Bathampton Junction.

References

Further reading

 

Disused railway stations in Bath, Somerset
Former Great Western Railway stations
Railway stations in Great Britain opened in 1857
Railway stations in Great Britain closed in 1966
History of Bath, Somerset
Beeching closures in England
1857 establishments in England